José María Segurola (born 27 April 1966) is a Spanish rower. He competed in the men's coxless four event at the 1988 Summer Olympics.

References

1966 births
Living people
Spanish male rowers
Olympic rowers of Spain
Rowers at the 1988 Summer Olympics
Place of birth missing (living people)